Jacques de Lacretelle (14 July 1888 in Cormatin, Saône-et-Loire – 2 January 1985) was a French novelist. He was elected to the Académie Française on 12 November 1936.

Bibliography
 1920  La vie inquiète de Jean Hermelin  (Grasset)
 1922  Silbermann (novel)  (Gallimard)
 1925  La Bonifas  (Gallimard)
 1925  Mélanges sur l'amour et les livres, terminés par un envoi  (Gallimard)
 1926  Trébuchet. Mort de la jalousie  (La Lampe d'Aladin)
 1926  Lettres espagnoles  (Gallimard)
 1926  Quatre études sur Gobineau  (La Lampe d'Aladin)
 1927  Aparté. Colère. Journal de colère. Dix jours à Ermenonville  (Gallimard)
 1927  Aperçus  (Marcelle Lesage)
 1927  Rêveries romantiques. Dix jours à Ermenonville. Le rêveur parisien  (Stendhal)
 1927  Virginie, ou les manies  (Champion (Édouard))
 1928  D'une colline. Quatre jours à Bayreuth  (Les Cahiers Libres)
 1928  L'âme cachée, nouvelles  (Gallimard)
 1928  Quatre nouvelles italiennes  (Lemarget)
 1928  Album napolitain  (Hazan)
 1928  Études  (Librairie Picard)
 1929  Histoire de Paola Ferrari  (Flammarion)
 1929  Le retour de Silbermann  (Gallimard)
 1930  Amour nuptial  (Gallimard) - Grand Prix du roman de l'Académie française
 1930  À la rencontre de France  (Trémois)
 1930  Le demi-dieu ou le voyage en Grèce  (Grasset)
 1930  Pressentiments  (Les Quatre Chemins)
 1931  Luce, ou l'enfance d'une courtisane  (Trémois)
 1932  Les Hauts Ponts. I. Sabine  (Gallimard)
 1933  Les Hauts Ponts. II. Les fiançailles  (Gallimard)
 1934  Les aveux étudiés  (Gallimard)
 1935  Les Hauts Ponts. III. Années d'espérance  (Gallimard)
 1935  Les Hauts Ponts. IV. La monnaie de plomb  (Gallimard)
 1936  L'écrivain public  (Gallimard)
 1936  Qui est La Roque ?  (Flammarion)
 1938  Morceaux choisis  (Gallimard)
 1939  Croisières en eaux troubles, carnets de voyage  (Gallimard)
 1940  Le Canada entre en guerre. Choses vues  (Flammarion)
 1941  L'Heure qui chante  (Le Milieu du monde)
 1945  Libérations  (Brentano's)
 1946  Idées dans un chapeau  (Le Rocher)
 1946  Le Pour et le Contre  (Le Milieu du monde)
 1953  Une visite en été, pièce en quatre actes  (Gallimard)
 1953  Deux cœurs simples  (Gallimard)
 1958  Paris. Présentation de Jacques de Lacretelle. Photos de Jacques Boulas  (Hachette)
 1959  Les Maîtres et les Amis. Études et souvenirs littéraires  (Wesmael-Charlier)
 1959  Le tiroir secret  (Wesmael-Charlier)
 1963  La galerie des amants, Anthologie de lettres d'amour (I)  (Librairie académique Perrin)
 1964  L'amour sur la place, Anthologie de lettres d'amour (II)  (Librairie académique Perrin)
 1964  Portraits d'hier et figures d'aujourd'hui  (Librairie académique Perrin)
 1974  Journal de bord  (Grasset)
 1977  Les vivants et leur ombre  (Grasset)
 1981  Quand le destin nous mène  (Grasset)

External links
 
  L'Académie française

Notes

1888 births
1985 deaths
People from Saône-et-Loire
Prix Femina winners
Members of the Académie Française
Grand Prix du roman de l'Académie française winners
French male novelists
20th-century French novelists
20th-century French male writers